Sharalday is a rural locality (a selo) in Mukhorshibirsky District, Republic of Buryatia, Russia. The population was 1,414 as of 2010. There are 9 streets.

Geography 
Sharalday is located 17 km west of Mukhorshibir (the district's administrative centre) by road. Novy Zagan is the nearest rural locality.

References 

Rural localities in Mukhorshibirsky District